Lobocleta granitaria is a species of geometrid moth in the family Geometridae. It was described by Alpheus Spring Packard in 1871 and is found in North America.

The MONA or Hodges number for Lobocleta granitaria is 7095.

References

 Scoble, Malcolm J., ed. (1999). Geometrid Moths of the World: A Catalogue (Lepidoptera, Geometridae), 1016.

Further reading

 Arnett, Ross H. (2000). American Insects: A Handbook of the Insects of America North of Mexico. CRC Press.

External links

 Butterflies and Moths of North America

Sterrhini
Moths described in 1871
Taxa named by Alpheus Spring Packard
Moths of North America